John Joseph Mitchell (May 9, 1873 – September 13, 1925) was a lawyer and U.S. Representative from Massachusetts.

Biography
Mitchell was born in Marlborough, Massachusetts, on May 9, 1873.  He attended  public schools, Boston College, and the Albany Law School. Mitchell was admitted to the bar and commenced practice in Marlborough.  He was elected a member of the Massachusetts House of Representatives, and served in the Massachusetts State Senate.

Mitchell was elected as a Democrat to the 61st United States Congress to fill the vacancy caused by the death of Charles Q. Tirrell, serving from November 8, 1910, to March 3, 1911. However, he lost a simultaneous election to the 62nd United States Congress, and therefore only served until the completion of the open term.

He was elected to the Sixty-third Congress to fill the vacancy caused by the resignation of John W. Weeks and served from April 15, 1913 to March 3, 1915. He was again an unsuccessful candidate for reelection in 1914 to the Sixty-fourth Congress.

Mitchell served as United States Marshal for Massachusetts during World War I. He was a collector of internal revenue for the district of Massachusetts between 1919 and 1921, and practiced as an attorney in Boston until his death in the Brighton neighborhood of Boston on September 13, 1925. He was interred in Immaculate Conception Cemetery in Marlborough.

See also
 128th Massachusetts General Court (1907)

External links
 

1873 births
1925 deaths
People from Marlborough, Massachusetts
Boston College alumni
Albany Law School alumni
Massachusetts lawyers
Democratic Party members of the Massachusetts House of Representatives
Democratic Party Massachusetts state senators
United States Marshals
Democratic Party members of the United States House of Representatives from Massachusetts
19th-century American lawyers